Charles Haas may refer to:

Charlie Haas (born 1972), American professional wrestler
Charles A. Haas, author and Titanic expert
Charles F. Haas (1913-2011), American film and television director
Charles N. Haas (born 1951), American environmental engineering professor, member National Academy of Engineering, recipient Athalie Richardson Irvine Clarke Prize
Charles S. Haas (born 1952), American screenwriter, actor and novelist